Floyd A. Keith (born August 22, 1948) is a former American football coach. He served as the head football coach at Howard University from 1979 to 1982 and at the University of Rhode Island from 1993 to 1999, compiling a career college football record of 46–70–2. He was a college football coach for 30 years, from 1970 to 1999. Keith was the executive director of the Black Coaches Association from 2001 to 2013. In 2013, he became the CEO of PPA Professional Services, a professional development and consulting group.  Presently, he is working as a sales manager for the Indianapolis Marriott East hotel in Indianapolis, Indiana.

Coaching career
After graduating from Ohio Northern University in 1970, Keith was hired as an assistant at Miami University in Oxford, Ohio under head coach Bill Mallory. He was placed in charge of the wingbacks and split ends, replacing Tirrel Burton, who had moved on to the University of Michigan.

Head coaching record

References

1948 births
Living people
Arizona Wildcats football coaches
Colorado Buffaloes football coaches
Howard Bison football coaches
Indiana Hoosiers football coaches
Miami RedHawks football coaches
Rhode Island Rams football coaches
Ohio Northern University alumni
People from St. Mary's, Ohio
Coaches of American football from Ohio
African-American coaches of American football
20th-century African-American sportspeople
21st-century African-American sportspeople